Wang Jing may refer to:

 Wang Jing (Han dynasty) (王景), Eastern Han dynasty official
 Wang Jing (Three Kingdoms) (died 260), Wei politician of the Three Kingdoms period
 Jing Wang (professor) (1950–2021), MIT professor
 Wang Jing (businessman) (born 1972), Chinese billionaire businessman
 Wang Jing (mountaineer) (born 1975), mountaineer and co-founder of Toread Holdings Group Co., Ltd.
 Wong Jing (王晶; born 1955), Hong Kong film director, producer, actor, presenter, and screenwriter
 Gingle Wang (王淨; born 1998), Taiwanese actress

Sportspeople
 Wang Jing (canoeist) (born 1971), Chinese canoeist
 Wang Jing (athlete) (born 1988), Chinese sprinter
 Wang Jing (cricketer), cricketer

See also
Wangjing (disambiguation) for locations
Wang Jin (disambiguation)